Alfred Dampier (28 February 1843? 1847? – 23 May 1908) was an English-born actor-manager
and playwright, active in Australia.

Dampier was born in Horsham, Sussex, England, the son of John Dampier, a builder, and his wife Mary, née Daly. Dampier had a stage career in Manchester before moving to Melbourne, Australia in 1873, under contract to the Harwood syndicate, consisting of H. R. Harwood, George Coppin, Richard Stewart (father of Nellie Stewart), and John Hennings, managers of Melbourne's Theatre Royal.

His first role was as Mephistopheles in his own adaptation of Goethe's Faust, followed by leading roles in Shakespearean dramas. After three years he undertook his own management and toured major towns in Australia and New Zealand, followed by America and England.

On his return to Australia, Dampier formed his own company, often producing plays with an Australian theme. He staged five plays by F. R. C. Hopkins between 1876 and 1882, and adapted For the Term of His Natural Life (1886), Robbery Under Arms (1890), and The Miner's Right (1891). A good number of actors stayed with Dampier through his changing fortunes — Carrie Bilton, Alfred Harford, Regel Rede, Alfred Rolfe, George Buller, Edmund Holloway, Julia Merton, Helen Nugent, J. B. Atholwood, Walter Baker, Watkin Wynne, Alfred Boothman, Ada Rochfort, May Holt (sister of Bland Holt), Harry Stoneham and Barry Marschall.

The two roles with which Dampier was most associated were Jean Valjean in Valjean, an adaptation of Les Misérables, and Captain Starlight in Robbery Under Arms.
He wrote (as "Adam Pierre") the jingoistic Briton and Boer, which was a "hit" at the Alexandra in 1900.

The Popular Australian Dramatic Company (1889–90) and Australian Dramatic Company (1890–1897), not to be confused with George Darrell's "Australian Dramatic Company" (1878–1888), were affiliated with the Holloway company.

Dampier died at his resident in Paddington, Sydney on 23 May 1908.

Family
In 1866 Dampier married the actress Katherine Alice Russell (c. 1848 – 8 March 1915), who continued using that name professionally. She was author of a play, The Phantom Ship.
She died from a stroke in Reading, Pennsylvania while touring America with her daughter Rose and son Fred. They had two daughters and one son.
Katherine Annabel Lily Dampier, known as Lily Dampier (died February 1915) was a noted actor in her own right. She was briefly married to actor William Watkins, known as Watkin Wynn. She subsequently married actor and director Alfred Rolfe, who adapted several of Dampier's plays to the screen.
Rose Dampier died while on tour in Nebraska in May 1919.
Alfred Julian "Fred" Dampier was also an actor, but never as successful as his father, sisters or brother in law. Fred had a secret marriage to one Vera (born c. 1885), also an actor, in 1905. They never lived together and she was granted a divorce in 1914.

Select writing credits
Valjean (1869) – adaptation of Les Misérables
Faust and Marguerite (1873) – adapted from the legends
Saint or Sinner (1876)
Uncle Tom's Cabin (1879) - adapted from the novelThe Nihilists (1880)Under the Southern Cross (1885)Uncle Tom's Cabin (1886) – with John F Sheridan, adapted from the novelOur Emily (1886)An English Lass (1886) – filmed as The Romantic Story of Margaret Catchpole (1912)Jess (1886)For the Term of His Natural Life (1886) – with Thomas Somers, adapted from the novel – later filmed as The Life of Rufus Dawes (1911)Marvellous Melbourne (1886) – with J H Wrangham and Thomas SomersShamus O'Brien (1889)East Lynn (1889)The Count of Monte Cristo (1890) – with Garnet Walch, adapted from the novelRobbery Under Arms (1890) – with Garnet Walch, adapted from the novel the novel – filmed as Captain Starlight, or Gentleman of the Road in 1911For Love and Life (1890)The Miner's Right (1891)The Scout (1891)The Trapper (1891)This Great City (1891)For Love and Life (1891)Wilful Murder (1892)Help One Another (1892)Thou Shalt Not Steal (1896)To the West (1896)Briton and Boer (as "Adam Pierre", 1900) — not to be confused with the George Griffith book Briton or BoerThe Bush King'' (1901) – rewrite of 1893 play – filmed in 1911

References

External links
Alfred Dampier 1847-1908 at liveperformance.com.au – Hall of Fame

1843 births
1908 deaths
Australian male stage actors
English male stage actors
Actor-managers
People from Horsham
British emigrants to colonial Australia
19th-century theatre managers
20th-century theatre managers
People from Paddington